Ramesses may refer to:

Ancient Egypt

Pharaohs of the nineteenth dynasty 
 Ramesses I, founder of the 19th Dynasty
 Ramesses II, also called "Ramesses the Great"
 Prince Ramesses (prince), second son of Ramesses II
 Prince Ramesses-Meryamun-Nebweben, a son of Ramesses II

Pharaohs of the twentieth dynasty 
 Ramesses III, adversary of the Sea Peoples
 Ramesses IV
 Ramesses V
 Ramesses VI
 Ramesses VII
 Ramesses VIII
 Ramesses IX
 Ramesses X
 Ramesses XI

Locations 
 Pi-Ramesses, founded by pharaoh Ramesses II on the former site of Avaris

Books 
 Ramses the Damned, an alternate title of the novel The Mummy by Anne Rice
 The Ramses (Ramsès) series of five best-selling historical novels, by French author and Egyptologist Christian Jacq

Entertainers and artists
 Albert Marchinsky, an illusionist whose stage name was "The Great Rameses"
 Ramases, an early-1970s-era British musician
 Ramsés VII, pseudonym used by Argentine singer-songwriter Tanguito (1945-1972)
 Ramesses (band), an English sludge/doom metal band, formed by ex-Electric Wizard members Tim Bagshaw and Mark Greening
 Ramses Shaffy (1933–2009), Dutch singer
 Ramses Younan (1913–1966), Egyptian painter and writer

Fictional characters 
 King Ramses, a minor villain in the animated cartoon Courage the Cowardly Dog
 Ramses Emerson, a fictional character in the "Amelia Peabody" book series by U.S. author Elizabeth Peters
 Ramses, a summon creature in the Game Boy Advance game Golden Sun
 Ramses XIII, protagonist of the 1895 historical novel Pharaoh by Bolesław Prus

Military 
 MV Ramses, a German blockade runner sunk by HMAS Adelaide in 1942
 The Ramses II tank, an Egyptian main battle tank

Products 
 Ramses, a brand of condom manufactured by Durex

Sports 
 Rameses (mascot), the mascot for the University of North Carolina at Chapel Hill